The Moldavian Cycling Federation, abbreviated to FCM, is the national governing body of cycle racing in Moldova.

The FCMis a member of the UCI and the UEC.

External links

National members of the European Cycling Union
Cycle racing in Moldova
Cycling
Cycle racing organizations